Ferrara Bakery and Cafe, established in 1892 by Antonio Ferrara, claims to be America's first espresso bar. It is located in Little Italy, Manhattan, New York City and offers Italian delicacies. Ferrara has remained a family owned business since its inception and is operated at its original location on Grand Street by the family's fifth generation of bakers.

See also
 List of Italian restaurants

References

Restaurants in Manhattan
1892 establishments in New York (state)
Italian restaurants in New York City
Italian-American culture in New York City
Little Italys in the United States

Grand Street (Manhattan)